Riccardo Magrini (Montecatini Terme, 26 December 1954) is an Italian former professional road bicycle racer and sporting director. In 1983 Magrini won a stage in the 1983 Giro d'Italia and in the 1983 Tour de France. He was a professional from 1977 to 1986. His career as a DS ended in 2004. Since then, he has been a cycling commentator for the Italian Eurosport channel.

Major results

1982
Giro della Provincia di Reggio Calabria
1983
Giro d'Italia:
Winner stage 9
Tour de France:
Winner stage 7

References

External links 

Official Tour de France results for Ricardo Magrini

Italian male cyclists
1954 births
Living people
Italian Tour de France stage winners
Italian Giro d'Italia stage winners
Sportspeople from the Province of Pistoia
Cyclists from Tuscany
Directeur sportifs